Sokolac Castle is a castle in Brinje, Croatia. It is named after the Croatian word for falcon (sokol), which appears on the town's coat of arms.

History
It dates back to medieval times built under King Ladislaus IV of Hungary, while the town was held by the noble Frankopan and Gorjanski families. The castle was part of an important medieval fortified city held by Frankopan family.

Sokolac Castle was an extremely grand building, dominated by the powerful perpendiculars of the entry tower, and the Chapel of the Holy Trinity. The entry into the burg was through a square, three-storey tower, the façades of which were relieved with lesenes linked at the top with blind arcades, making it a unique specimen in the whole of Central Europe.

Gallery

See also
Brinje
List of castles in Croatia
Frankopan
Gorjanski
Fortification

References

External links

Castles in Croatia
Buildings and structures in Lika-Senj County
Tourist attractions in Lika-Senj County
History of Lika